Mangesh Panchal (born 27 December 1973) is an Indian-born Dutch One Day International cricketer. He made his debut for the Netherlands against Bermuda in August 2007.

External links

1973 births
Living people
Dutch cricketers
Netherlands One Day International cricketers
Indian emigrants to the Netherlands
Indian cricketers
Cricketers from Mumbai